Greatest Hits is the twelfth major album release by Irish boy band Westlife. It was released on 18 November 2011 by RCA Records and Sony Music. Greatest Hits is the group's second greatest hits album following Unbreakable: The Greatest Hits Volume 1 (2002) and their last before their split months later and reformation six years later. The album is the group's first album not under Syco Music and not under the tutelage of Simon Cowell, having left Syco and Cowell in March 2011. It was also the band's seventh album released as a four-piece. The greatest hits album contains numerous singles that span throughout the band's career, as well as six live tracks, two from BBC Proms in the Park and four from Live at O2 Arena. Another four new songs produced by John Shanks, which includes the lead single "Lighthouse", which was released on 14 November 2011. The compilation was released in two different formats, a standard edition containing the album's eighteen tracks, and a deluxe edition featuring numerous other singles of the band's discography, as well as a DVD containing almost all of the band's music videos on the past fourteen years of their music career.

Upon the album's release, Greatest Hits received mixed reviews from music critics, with some reviewers praising the compilation's structure, while others disliked the group's musical style implemented in the songs. The compilation reached No. 4 in the UK Albums Chart; it is the lowest peaking position for a Westlife album. Despite the peak history of the album in the United Kingdom, it sold more than 600,000 units and is certified 2× Platinum by the British Phonographic Industry as of November 2018 making it as one of their best-selling albums of all time in the UK. Officially, this is the ninety-seventh best-selling album, thirty-fourth best-selling album from a band, fortieth best-selling album from a non-British act, twenty-sixth non-British album act, fifteenth best-selling greatest hits album of the 2010s decade in the United Kingdom.

In other countries, the album debuted at the No. 1 position on the Irish Albums Chart, while it peaked within the top forty of New Zealand and Norway. It charted at number-seventy at the South Korean Year-end Albums Chart with a recorded 2,449 number of sales.

The album has been reissued with the title Greatest Hits: Gold Series in a limited gold tinted CD in Australia on 27 October 2017.

Background
It was recorded from May - September 2011 with the band's Gravity producer Shanks and new producers like Dan Radclyffe and Boxsta Martin. On 5 September 2011, it was confirmed the album to be simply titled as Greatest Hits. The group said, "It’s almost hard to believe that we’ve been doing this for as long as we have. We’re incredibly proud of what we’ve achieved and are looking forward to releasing our Greatest Hits as a special thank you to our fans who have supported us throughout our career." Egan added: "Our greatest hits album is out soon, and we’ve worked so hard to put together four or five new tracks for the album. The new songs are great and we’re all really pleased with them. We think the fans will love them too." Bryne explained: "I'm doing a bit of everything to be honest, We just came back from the UK, we were there for four days. We were in the studio for four or five weeks but we finished there about a month ago." In China Daily, they said that Westlife has taken their music and career to another level. "'We’re all at least 30 years of age. We could all go home now and we’d be all right for the rest of our lives,’ Feehily says. "So, if we are going to make more records, we want to do it well. Otherwise we don’t want to do it at all".

The album is a three-disc set. On 4 September 2011, Amazon.co.uk and Play.com revealed aside from the standard and deluxe editions, each record stores have included free postcards and an exclusively signed copies respectively. On 8 September 2011, the pre-order link for the said album has already been available for 36 countries on their official store. On 15 September 2011, the pre-order link for the special limited edition of the box set was announced.' It featured a 2CD/DVD deluxe version of the boys' Greatest Hits album alongside a poster and exclusive pictures of the boys and included a special photobook showing the boys incredible journey over the last 14 years including a selection of submitted fan pictures. As a special thank you for all of the amazing support so far, the boys have signed the first 500 copies of the box set. The signed edition of the album was sold-out in less than 24 hours. Before that, in August 2011 they made a contest for the fans to contribute on the upcoming Westlife boxset. They were looking to make a special boxset filled with some of the greatest things that you have collected over your time as a Westlife fan. On 27 and 31 October 2011, Sony Music announced a "PureSolo competition" of singing along with their hits and "an album listening party" respectively. On 6 November 2011, they launched a joined venture with MixPixie that customize a personalised album cover. This product is approved by several music record labels and will be fully launched by the year 2012. Westlife is the first on-hand to accept this product. Added for HMV.co.uk events were album signing personally by the lads with the schedule as follows: HMV Glasgow Buchanan Street, Monday, 21 November 2011, 9.00 am; HMV Newcastle Northumberland Street, Monday, 21 November 2011, 1.00 pm; and HMV Manchester 90 Market Street, Monday, 21 November 2011, 6.00 pm

A final track list for the collection of the 18-track standard edition of the album was confirmed by Swedish's CDON.com while the additional deluxe edition wasn't revealed yet. On 12 October 2011, the official site completely announced the track listing. While 4music first announced the track listing for the DVD. There are four new tracks on the standard edition, those are: "Beautiful World" (written by Feehily, Shanks and Ruth-Anne Cunningham), "Wide Open" and "Last Mile of the Way" (co-written by Byrne, Filan, Dimitri Ehrlich, Coyle Girelli) and the lead single to be released on 14 November 2011, "Lighthouse".

In 2014 (two years after the album release), one of the co-writers Dimitri Ehrlich published the original demo version of the song "Last Mile of the Way" on his SoundCloud account with a description "I wrote this one with Coyle Girelli. It was covered by Westlife who did a great job but this is our original demo and I love this vocal so much. I wrote this lyric for my parents.

Album artwork
The album photoshoot happened on South Africa starting on 17 September 2011, same time with the lead single music video shoot. It was described as a "very special photo shoot" on Female First. On 12 October 2011, the official site posted the album artwork. Julia Simpson of Yahoo OMG! UK reported: "'Westlife have been known to do many a cheesy pose in their time. And so we're thrilled to see that the artwork for their brand new album sees them striking one of their best model poses yet. The Irish boyband (that's Nicky, Kian, Mark and Shane) master the art of the staring-into-the-distance-longingly shot in the cover shot for their Greatest Hits. And we know we've probably drunk too many cups of tea slash been staring at a computer screen for too long but we've convinced ourselves they're staring at us. We reviewed the lads' brand new single Lighthouse and it made us feel all autumnal. And this shot is having the same effect - with the fresh blue sky, orange hues in the trees and the biker boots/cardis."

Reception

Greatest Hits received mixed reviews from music critics. Critics that positively received the album praised the album's track listing and new songs, particularly "Beautiful World". Reviewers that criticized the album also noted the group's repetitive formula in their songs.

Shaun Kitchener of Trash Lounge gave the compilation a perfect five stars, calling it "the perfect way for the band to bid farewell." Robert Copsey of Digital Spy gave the album four stars out of five, praising the inclusion of numerous hits in the track listing, as well as the new songs of the compilation. However, he was disappointed that the new songs "point to what could have been an interesting new direction for the band". Alistair McGeorge of Female First called the album a "fine retrospective of one of the best boy-bands in history", as well as assuring the listeners that they will be "taken on a journey from the band’s beginnings through to their last recordings, constantly reminded of the talent they showed."

Fraser McAlpine of BBC Music gave a mixed review of the album, noting the repetitive structure of the group's previous hits, and that listening to the album felt "strange". Despite this, he praised the album's last three tracks. Simon Gage of Daily Express said that the compilation "needs no introduction with big key-change numbers like "Flying Without Wings" and "You Raise Me Up" telling their own story." Star Magazine UK called the group's formula "annoyingly, irresistibly effective" and that "it's the ballads they’ll be remembered for." Jon O'Brien of Rovi Music gave the album a borderline two and a half out of five stars, saying, "while this collection contains a few pop gems, it's a samey and uninspiring listen that suggests their split has been well overdue." He also noted that numerous uptempo songs and four No. 1 hits ("Seasons in the Sun", "Fool Again", "Unbreakable" and "The Rose") were excluded from the album's standard edition. Pip Ellwood of Entertainment Focus gave the album a negative review, saying that listening to the album was like "listening to one song for just over an hour." While Allmusic only gave 2.5 of 5 stars.

Promotion

Schedule
Some were pre-recorded/taped or live interview and performances.

Track listing
Standard Edition

 Deluxe Edition Bonus Disc

 "Last Mile of the Way" or "The Last Mile of the Way".

Credits

Charts

Weekly charts

Monthly charts

Year-end charts

Decade-end charts

Certifications and sales

Release history

Main release

Import release

References

Westlife albums
2011 greatest hits albums
Albums produced by John Shanks
Albums produced by David Foster
Albums produced by Steve Mac
Albums produced by David Kreuger
Albums produced by Per Magnusson
Albums produced by Rami Yacoub
Sony Music compilation albums
RCA Records compilation albums